The 1989 East Texas State Lions football team represented East Texas State University—now known as Texas A&M University–Commerce—as a member of the Lone Star Conference (LSC) during the 1989 NCAA Division II football season. Led by fourth-year head coach Eddie Vowell, the Lions compiled an overall record of 4–6 with a mark of 2–5 in conference play, placing in a three-way tied for fifth in the LSC. The team played its home games at Memorial Stadium in Commerce, Texas.

Schedule

Postseason awards

All-Americans
Terry Bagsby, Second Team Defensive End
Gary Compton, Second Team Receiver

All-Lone Star Conference

LSC First Team
Terry Bagsby, Defensive Lineman

LSC Second Team
Gary Compton, Wide Receiver 
Kit Morton, Defensive End
John Varnell, Center

LSC Honorable Mention
Johnie Hurndon, Running Back 
Shane Summers, Punter

References

East Texas State
Texas A&M–Commerce Lions football seasons
East Texas State Lions football